The Gaari were an indigenous Australian people of the Northern territory, who lived on a small island in the Arafura Sea.

Language
The Gaari language is believed to have differed only slightly from  Mawng.

Country
The Gaari's traditional land, including reefs offshore, comprised the 20 sq. miles, predominantly the area of Grant Island close to the near Goulburn Islands and 10 miles north of Cape Cockburn. The native name of the island is Wuru:ldja. It may be a lapsus calami but Tindale elsewhere places them on Howard Island.

People
The Gaari are registered by Norman Tindale as a separate tribe, but  he notes that they may possibly have been a horde of the Mawng.

Notes

Citations

Sources

Aboriginal peoples of the Northern Territory